Petaluma and Santa Rosa Railroad was a 600 volt DC electric interurban railway in Sonoma County, California, United States. It operated between the cities of Petaluma, Sebastopol, Forestville, and Santa Rosa.  Company-owned steamboats provided service between Petaluma and San Francisco.

Portions of the original right-of-way have been acquired by Sonoma County government for the West County Trail and Joe Rodota Trail, managed by the Sonoma County Regional Parks Department.
A portion of the original right-of-way can be found along the waterfront in Petaluma. Efforts have been made by volunteers to re-activate this line to become a trolley line once again.

History 
On June 20, 1903, the Santa Rosa Street Railway, the Union Street Railway of Santa Rosa, the Petaluma Street Railroad, and the Central Street Railway were consolidated to form the Petaluma and Santa Rosa Railway. The four consolidated horse car lines built between 1888 and 1891 were to be replaced by an electric railroad operated in conjunction with the Steamer Gold which had been providing ferry service between Petaluma and San Francisco since 1883. A first-spike ceremony was held on April 5, 1904, at the Steamer Gold landing at the foot of Copeland Street. The electric line was completed to Sebastopol in October, and extended along Sebastopol road toward the western edge of Santa Rosa.

The construction crew needed to cross the north-south steam railroad to reach downtown Santa Rosa. The steam railroad had operated a parallel branch line from Santa Rosa to Sebastopol since 1890, and would not consent to the crossing allowing a new competitor to offer direct service downtown. By November the steam railroad stationed guards at the proposed crossing site to prevent cutting of its rails. Trolley service began to the west side of the crossing on December 1, 1904.  Rails were laid on the east side of the steam railroad tracks, and an electric wire was strung overhead in preparation for installing the crossing. A threatened boycott of the steam railroad by 92 Santa Rosa merchants had no effect.

The Battle of Sebastopol Road 

A crossing was prefabricated in Sebastopol and loaded on a flat car pushed to the crossing location, but when the interurban crew arrived to install the crossing on January 3, 1905, they found a pair of steam locomotives on either side of the crossing fitted with steam nozzles to spray hot water on anyone approaching the crossing site.  The interurban construction crew retreated.

The following day the regularly scheduled interurban car #57 arrived secretly carrying the construction crew.  Before the steam railway could respond, the crew laid a temporary track across and over the steam rails and had a team of horses pull trolley #57 across to serve downtown Santa Rosa.  The steam railroad then obtained a temporary injunction from a San Francisco judge prohibiting installation of the crossing.  For a few weeks, passengers from Sebastopol were required to depart their arriving trolley and walk over the steam railroad to reboard trolley #57 for the remainder of the trip.

The injunction was dissolved in late February and the interurban construction crew assembled again to install the crossing on March 1, 1905.  The steam railroad appeared to be unaware of the status of their injunction, and so their locomotives again discouraged the construction crew with hot water.  A special steam railroad train arrived with 150 San Francisco waterfront thugs hired to discourage the interurban crew.  The steam railroad also had a flat car loaded with gravel on hand for their men to fill in the excavation as soon as the interurban crew tried to dig out the crossing site. Tempers flared and several hundred Santa Rosa citizens assembled to watch the entertainment.  Santa Rosa police ultimately restored order, and the crossing was installed that evening.

Expansion 

With the main line from Petaluma to Santa Rosa in operation, a branch line extended service from Sebastopol to Forestville on July 15, 1905. The 1906 San Francisco earthquake cancelled plans for additional extensions to Tomales, Dillon Beach, Geyserville, Healdsburg, Sonoma, Napa, and a closer San Francisco ferry connection on Point Pedro near San Rafael; and completion of a branch line from Liberty to Two Rock was delayed until July 28, 1913. Economic recovery from the quake allowed purchase of the steamer Resolute in 1912, and it was rebuilt as Petaluma to allow two daily ferry connections in 1914. Steamer Gold burned on November 29, 1920, but was replaced by the steamer Fort Bragg (renamed Gold).

Decline 
Passenger service on the Two Rock branch was discontinued on September 30, 1925, after monthly passenger revenues on the branch dropped from $400 to $27. A new passenger and freight depot was built in Santa Rosa in 1927. The Santa Rosa line was dismantled from McDonald Avenue to Olive Street in 1931. The Petaluma & Santa Rosa was purchased by Northwestern Pacific Railroad (NWP) in 1932 and all trolley passenger service ended on July 1 of that year. Ferry passenger service was discontinued in 1935, but both ferries continued to carry freight until Gold was scrapped in 1940. Petaluma made the last ferry trip on August 24, 1950. The Santa Rosa line was dismantled from Olive Street to Stop 45 junction with the NWP Sebastopol branch in 1946 and from Stop 45 to Leddy junction with the NWP branch in 1947. Electric operation ended when Motor #1008 brought a carload of horses to Liberty on January 24, 1947. Diesel locomotives replaced the electric motors which were burned at Sacramento on March 15, 1947. Southern Pacific Railroad diesel locomotives replaced the last Petaluma and Santa Rosa diesel in 1966. The Forestville line was shortened by another mile to Sagu in 1969. Eight miles of track were abandoned between Denman and Turner in 1973, and four more miles of track were abandoned between Turner and Alten in 1978. Sonoma County supervisors directed the parks department to acquire portions of the abandoned right-of-way as the line from Santa Rosa to Sebastopol was abandoned between 1984 to 1989. NWP continued using the southern end of the line to serve local industries in Petaluma.

Route 

From south to north:
Milepost 0 – Petaluma
Milepost 3.6 – Denman
Milepost 5.1 – Liberty – branch west to: Cherry (MP 7.7) and Two Rock (MP 10.4)
Milepost 7.9 – Stony Point
Milepost 9.4 – Roblar
Milepost 9.6 – Quarry
Milepost 10.9 – Orchard
Milepost 11.3 – Turner
Milepost 13.2 – Cunningham
Milepost 14.9 – Alten
Milepost 16.7 – Sebastopol – branch east to: Leddy (MP 20.2), Stop 45 (MP 22.6), and Santa Rosa (MP 23.4)
Milepost 20.9 – Graton
Milepost 23.8 – Forestville

Roster of passenger rolling stock

Roster of freight motors 

The company roster included 89 conventional freight cars (unpowered trailers) in 1931.

See also 
 Petaluma and Santa Rosa Railway Powerhouse
 William Ashburner Cattell (1803–1920), president, Petaluma and Santa Rosa Railroad

Sources

Notes

External links 
Western Railway Museum which has restored and operates P&SR car #63.
Petaluma Trolley which has restored P&SR car #8.
Northwestern Pacific Railroad Historical Society is restoring P&SR caboose #1.
West County Trail
Map of the Petaluma and Santa Rosa Railroad

Defunct California railroads
History of Sonoma County, California
Interurban railways in California
Transportation in Sonoma County, California
Sebastopol, California